Divorce in Montevideo is a 1939  Argentine comedy film directed by Manuel Romero. The tango film premiered in Buenos Aires and starred Enrique Serrano.

Cast
Niní Marshall
Enrique Serrano
Sabina Olmos
Marcelo Ruggero
Roberto García Ramos
Mary Dormal
Nélida Bilbao
Fernando Campos
Pedro Laxalt
Hilda Sour
Nathán Pinzón

External links

1939 films
1930s Spanish-language films
Argentine black-and-white films
1939 comedy films
Films directed by Manuel Romero
Argentine comedy films
1930s Argentine films